The 2002 Western Kentucky Hilltoppers football team represented Western Kentucky University in the 2002 NCAA Division I-AA football season and were led by head coach Jack Harbaugh in his 14th and final season as head coach. They claimed a share of the Gateway Football Conference championship and made the school’s third straight appearance in the NCAA Division I-AA playoffs. After a rocky start, the team rallied to win their last 10 games including the 2002 NCAA Division I-AA Football Championship Game, beating McNeese State, 34–14, in Chattanooga, Tennessee. The Hilltoppers finished the season ranked number 1 in both final 1AA postseason national polls.

This team won the school's first NCAA team championship and tied the program record for victories in a season set by the 1973 Western Kentucky Hilltoppers football team. Their roster included future National Football League (NFL) players Sherrod Coates, Jeremi Johnson, and Brian Claybourn, and future NFL coach Jason Michael.  Coates, Chris Price, and Buster Ashley were named to the AP All American team and Harbuagh was named AFCA Coach of the Year Award. The All Conference team included Ashley, Coates, Price, Jeremy Chandler, Erik Dandy, Jon Frazier, and Daniel Withrow.

Schedule

Game summaries

Kansas State

References

Western Kentucky
Western Kentucky Hilltoppers football seasons
NCAA Division I Football Champions
Missouri Valley Football Conference champion seasons
Western Kentucky Hilltoppers football